Daegu International Opera Festival (DIOF) is a festival that is held in Daegu, South Korea. The festival takes place in  mid October. However, the 16th DIOF commenced in September. Alongside grand opera performances, there are a host of programs in DIOF such as back stage tour, square opera, Opera Odessey (free lectures regarding opera), pre-concert, lucky seats etc.

History
Daegu International Opera Festival (DIOF) is the representative music festival in South Korea and is the largest International Opera Festival in Asia. The festival has accomplished an enormous growth since its commencement. DIOF continuously endeavors to culturally enlighten people. Moreover, it functions as an Asian cultural hub by bringing various high quality foreign productions. DIOF may be the only chance to enjoy a lot of rare combinations of renowned artists.

See also

 Daegu Opera House
List of opera festivals
List of music festivals in South Korea 
List of classical music festivals

References

http://www.daeguoperahouse.org

External links 
  

Opera festivals
Tourist attractions in Daegu
Annual events in South Korea
Music festivals established in 2003
Music festivals in South Korea
Classical music festivals in South Korea
Festivals in Daegu
Autumn events in South Korea